Jonathan Ezequiel Perlaza Leiva (born 13 September 1997 in Guayaquil, Ecuador) is an Ecuadorian footballer who plays for Liga MX club Querétaro.

Career
On Jan 6, 2020 Jonathan joined Liga MX club Querétaro from Guayaquil City.

References

External links

1997 births
Living people
Ecuadorian footballers
Association football midfielders
Ecuadorian expatriate footballers
Expatriate footballers in Mexico
Guayaquil City F.C. footballers
Querétaro F.C. footballers